The 1931–32 Montreal Canadiens season was the team's 23rd season. After winning two consecutive Stanley Cup championships, the Canadiens were favoured to repeat, winning the Canadian division, but lost to the New York Rangers in the semi-finals.

Regular season
Howie Morenz won the Hart Trophy for his outstanding play during the regular season..

Final standings

Record vs. opponents

Schedule and results

Playoffs
The Canadiens, by placing first, received a bye to the semi-finals where they met the New York Rangers, who had won the American Division. The Canadiens, missing some regulars due to injury, lost  the best-of-five series three games to one.

 New York Rangers vs. Montreal Canadiens

Player statistics

Regular season
Scoring

Goaltending

Playoffs
Scoring

Goaltending

Awards and records
 O'Brien Cup – winners of Canadian Division
 Hart Trophy – Howie Morenz, most valuable player

Transactions

See also
1931–32 NHL season

References

Montreal Canadiens seasons
Montreal Canadiens
Montreal Canadiens